John Richard Nesselroade (born March 13, 1936) is an American psychologist known for his work in developmental and quantitative psychology. He is the Hugh Scott Hamilton Professor of Psychology emeritus at the University of Virginia and an adjunct professor of human development at Pennsylvania State University. He retired from the University of Virginia in June 2011 after serving as the Hugh Scott Hamilton Professor there for twenty years. He is a fellow of the American Association for the Advancement of Science, the Gerontological Society of America, and the American Psychological Association (APA), as well as a charter fellow of the American Psychological Society. He served as president of the APA's Division 20 from 1982 to 1983, and of the Society of Multivariate Experimental Psychology from 1999 to 2000.

Nesselroade studied with Raymond Cattell at the University of Illinois at Urbana–Champaign in the 1960s. This later proved controversial when Nesselroade served on the NCAA's Data Analysis Working Group in the 1990s and Congresswoman Cardiss Collins wrote a letter to the NCAA criticizing him and two other panelists (John L. Horn and John J. McArdle) for their links to Cattell. Collins, as well as the Black Coaches Association, accused the panelists of sympathizing with Cattell's support for eugenics. McArdle, who was the panel's principal consultant, insisted that neither he nor any other member of the working group supported Cattell's eugenic belief system.

Awards and recognition

Nesselroade received the Division 20 of the APA's Distinguished Contribution Award in 1994 and their Master Mentor Award in 2001. In 2010 he presented the Paul B. Baltes Lecture at the Berlin-Brandenburg Academy of Sciences and Humanities. In 2015, he received the Samuel J. Messick Distinguished Scientific Contributions Award from Division 5 of the APA.

References

External links

Faculty page

Living people
21st-century American psychologists
1936 births
University of Virginia faculty
Fellows of the American Association for the Advancement of Science
Marietta College alumni
University of Illinois Urbana-Champaign alumni
American developmental psychologists
West Virginia University faculty
Pennsylvania State University faculty
Fellows of the American Psychological Association
Fellows of the Association for Psychological Science
Fellows of the Gerontological Society of America
Quantitative psychologists
20th-century American psychologists